A number of locations around the Earth have alpine climate. The climate of some of these locations is described, below.

For tropical oceanic locations, such as the summit of Mauna Loa, elev. , the temperature is roughly constant throughout the year:

For mid-latitude locations, such as Mount Washington in New Hampshire, the temperature varies seasonally, but never gets very warm:

Other examples of alpine climate include

References

Mountain meteorology
Alpine climate locations
Alpine climate locations